The Jennings Handicap is an American Thoroughbred horse race run annually at Laurel Park Racecourse in Laurel, Maryland. Raced in December each year, it is open to horses age three and older that are registered Maryland-breds and is contested on dirt over a distance of 1 mile (8 furlongs).

Prior to 1993, the race alternated locations between Laurel Park and Pimlico Race Course in Baltimore. The race has been run at four different distances:  miles,  miles, 1 mile, and 6 furlongs.

The race was named in honor of William Jennings Sr. who was one of Maryland's all-time great horsemen. His Glengar Farm was located six miles from "Old Hilltop" (Pimlico Race Course) on Smith Avenue in Baltimore, Maryland. Jennings achieved national prominence in the late 19th century. Among his good horses was 1887 Preakness Stakes winner Dunboyne, whom he bred, owned and trained. His heritage continued through his grandson, U.S. Racing Hall of Fame trainer Henry S. Clark, regarded by many as the dean of Maryland horse trainers.

Records 

Speed record: 
  miles - 1:48.40 - Include (2001)
  miles - 1:42.20 - Amber Hawk (1972)

Most wins by a horse:
 4 - Eighttofasttocatch (2011, 2012, 2013, 2014)
 3 - Little Bold John    (1987, 1988 & 1989)

Most wins by a jockey:
 5 - Donnie Miller Jr.    (1983, 1986, 1987, 1988 & 1989)

Most wins by a trainer:
 4 - Tim Keefe (2011, 2012, 2013, 2014)
 3 - Jerry Robb    (1987, 1988 & 1989)

Winners of the Jennings Handicap since 1923

See also 
 Jennings Handicap top three finishers
 Laurel Park Racecourse

References

Open middle distance horse races
Restricted stakes races in the United States
1923 establishments in Maryland
Laurel Park Racecourse
Horse races in Maryland
Recurring sporting events established in 1923